Jerone Lamar Davison (born September 16, 1970) is a former American football running back. He played for the Sacramento Gold Miners in 1994 and for the Oakland Raiders from 1996 to 1997. He ran in the Republican primary for the U.S. House in Arizona's 4th congressional district in 2022.

Political career
He lost the primary election on August 2, 2022. 

In July 2022, Davison released a 30-second advertisement in which he protects his home from "a dozen angry Democrats in Klan hoods" with an AR-15. The advertisement went viral, gathering more than 5 million views on Twitter.

References

1970 births
Living people
American football running backs
Arizona Republicans
Arizona State Sun Devils football players
Candidates in the 2022 United States House of Representatives elections
Sacramento Gold Miners players
Rhein Fire players
Oakland Raiders players
People from Picayune, Mississippi
Players of American football from Mississippi
People from Tempe, Arizona
Junior college football players in the United States